KBOW (550 AM) is a radio station licensed to serve Butte, Montana.  The station is owned by Butte Broadcasting, Inc.  It airs a country music format.

The main offices and studios of Butte Broadcasting are at 660 Dewey in Butte.  The KBOW transmitter site is southwest of town on Beef Trail Road.

The station was assigned the KBOW call sign by the Federal Communications Commission.

References

External links
FCC History Cards for KBOW

Country radio stations in the United States
BOW
Radio stations established in 1980
1980 establishments in Montana